State Highway 65 (also known as the Shenandoah Highway) is a New Zealand state highway in the South Island. It is 71 km long and runs south to north down the Maruia river valley from SH 7 at Springs Junction, 15 km west of the main divide at the Lewis Pass, to SH 6 in the Buller Gorge, 11 km west of Murchison. It forms part of the most direct route between Christchurch and Nelson. It takes its name from a small settlement toward its northern end.

The road is sealed and two-lane, with some single-lane bridges. The surrounding country is used for pastoral farming (beef and dairy) with some forestry on the surrounding hills.
Springs Junction is the only locality with fuel or food along the route while Maruia is the largest settlement along the route.

Maruia Falls, a 5-m waterfall near the road, did not exist prior to the 1929 Murchison earthquake (magnitude 7.8).

See also
List of New Zealand state highways

References

External links
 New Zealand Transport Agency

65